Francis Foxall (11 March 1883 –  1968) was an English professional footballer who scored 52 goals in 204 appearances in the Football League playing for Doncaster Rovers, Gainsborough Trinity, Sheffield Wednesday and Birmingham. He played as an outside forward.

Foxall was born in Sheffield. He played football for Roundel and Wombwell Town before joining Doncaster Rovers of the Second Division in 1902. The following year Foxall moved on to Gainsborough Trinity, also of the Second Division, where he spent four years, scoring League goals at a rate close to one every three games. This earned him a move to established First Division club Sheffield Wednesday, on the verge of winning the 1907 FA Cup Final. Foxall scored twice in what remained of the 1906–07 season, and over the next three years averaged 15 first-team games a season. In April 1910 he moved on to Birmingham, on the verge of having to apply for re-election. Birmingham experimented with Foxall at inside forward with little success, and he soon returned to the wing, but after a year with the club he moved on again, this time to Shrewsbury Town.

On 12 November 1908, he was convicted of assault causing actual bodily harm for "maliciously assaulting" a man from Sheffield two months prior. He was fined £20.

He was married to Selena (or Selina) Green in 1903. He died in 1968 in Rotherham, West Riding of Yorkshire.

References

1883 births
1968 deaths
Footballers from Sheffield
English footballers
Association football forwards
Roundel F.C. players
Wombwell Town F.C. (1890s) players
Doncaster Rovers F.C. players
Gainsborough Trinity F.C. players
Sheffield Wednesday F.C. players
Birmingham City F.C. players
Shrewsbury Town F.C. players
English Football League players
Date of death missing